Shawarin . Hamadan
Sheverin (also Romanized as Sheverīn, Shavarīn, Shawarīn, Shevarīn, and Shūrīn) is a village in Sangestan Rural District, in the Central District of Hamadan County, Hamadan Province, Iran. At the 2006 census, its population was 3,870, in 1,034 families. In 1906 Abraham Valentine Williams Jackson described Sheverin as Armenian village where were fine gardens.

Notable natives
 Hovhannes Badalyan (1924-2001), Armenian singer and professor

References 

Populated places in Hamadan County